The 2012 Adecco Ex-Yu Cup was the second edition of this tournament, created with the aim to create a new Cup for the Ex-Yugoslavia countries.
Only four teams played in second edition. Macedonia, who played the Olympic Qualifying Tournament, and Montenegro withdrew of the competition.
The tournament was held at the Slovenian Arena Stožice once again.

Venues

Participating teams

Standings 

|}

Results 
All times are local Central European Summer Time (UTC+2).

Final standing

References

2012–13
International basketball competitions hosted by Slovenia
2012–13 in Serbian basketball
2012–13 in Slovenian basketball
2012–13 in Croatian basketball
2012–13 in Bosnia and Herzegovina basketball
Sport in Ljubljana